Frederick Archer (21 November 1888 – 12 May 1937) was a Barbadian cricketer. He played in thirteen first-class matches for the Barbados cricket team from 1907 to 1926.

See also
 List of Barbadian representative cricketers

References

External links
 

1888 births
1937 deaths
Barbadian cricketers
Barbados cricketers
People from Christ Church, Barbados